Mary Miller Glasscock (1872–1925) was the wife of former Governor of West Virginia William E. Glasscock and served as that state's First Lady, 1909–1913. She was born September 8, 1872, at Arnettsville, West Virginia. In 1888, just shy of her 16th birthday, she married William E. Glasscock. As first lady, she hosted social gatherings and participated in Charleston civic affairs.

After leaving office, the Glasscocks resided at Morgantown, West Virginia where she died from breast cancer on April 12, 1925, aged 52, less than three months after the death of her husband.

References

1872 births
1925 deaths
Deaths from cancer in West Virginia
Deaths from breast cancer
First Ladies and Gentlemen of West Virginia
People from Monongalia County, West Virginia
People from Morgantown, West Virginia